Jane Thérèse "Tessa" Jackson OBE (born 5 November 1955) is a British contemporary art curator, writer and administrator.

The daughter of John Nevill Jackson and Viva Christian Thérèse (née Blomfield) Jackson, she was educated at the University of East Anglia, the University of Manchester and the University of Bristol, where she took her master's degree.

She served as CEO of the London-based Institute of International Visual Arts (Iniva) in London, from 2010 to 2015.

Career
In 1991, Jackson was appointed as the director of the Arnolfini (Bristol's contemporary art venue), in which she played a leading role in the redevelopment of the institution.

In 1999, she was appointed director of the Scottish Arts Council, where she was responsible for the public funding of the arts in Scotland. After two years in post, she left, after falling out with SAC chairman James Boyle.

In 2002, she became the founding artistic director and chief executive of the Artes Mundi Prize, a contemporary art prize in Wales, a position which she held until 2010. Simultaneously, she was also the chair of the Edinburgh Art Festival between 2005 and 2010.

Appointed to her position as CEO of Iniva in 2009, she has continued to uphold the organisation's remit to bring leading black, Asian, African, Middle-Eastern, Caribbean, Oceanic and Latin American contemporary artists from around the world to the London venue, which had become, in 2007, the capital's first purpose-built, publicly funded international contemporary art gallery since the Hayward Gallery in 1968.

Speaking to LabKulture in 2011, Jackson stated that her aim at Iniva was, "to diversify how we look at society – through the visual arts... poking society in the ribs a little bit and reminding us there are different view points, different histories that historically in Britain we haven’t always given a proper platform to." During her time at Iniva, the organisation's Arts Council National Portfolio Organisation core funding was reduced by 75% following an exposé by the art critic Morgan Quaintance which deemed the organisation unfit for its purpose.

Following her departure from Iniva in 2015, Jackson was appointed to the board of trustees of The Centre for Chinese Contemporary Art. In 2021, during her time as chair of the artistic committee, the centre faced a mass boycott by artists of the Chinese community following a refusal to engage in discussions on racism with Chinese Artist groups. The boycott was triggered by an open letter written by the artist JJ Chan citing a culture of institutional racism and the dominance of white perspectives within the organisation at all levels.

Awards
In 2011, Jackson was awarded an OBE (Order of the British Empire) in the Queen's New Year's Honours List, in  recognition for her 25 years of service to art.

Selected bibliography

Notes

Living people
1955 births
Place of birth missing (living people)
British art critics
British art curators
Alumni of the University of East Anglia
Alumni of the University of Manchester
Alumni of the University of Bristol
Officers of the Order of the British Empire